Daurance Lester Williams (born 13 May 1983) is a retired Trinidadian football player.

Career statistics

International

References

External links
 

1983 births
Living people
Trinidad and Tobago footballers
Trinidad and Tobago international footballers
Association football goalkeepers
2007 CONCACAF Gold Cup players
San Juan Jabloteh F.C. players
Joe Public F.C. players
St. Ann's Rangers F.C. players